Sergio Pesce (1916–1995) was an Italian cinematographer.

Selected filmography 
 Macario Against Zagomar (1944)
 The Ten Commandments (1945)
 The Iron Swordsman (1949)
 Twenty Years (1949)
 Son of d'Artagnan (1950)
 The Transporter (1950)
 Free Escape (1951)
 The Legend of the Piave (1952)
 Love Song (1954)
 The Mysteries of Paris (1957)
 La sceriffa (1959)

References

Bibliography 
 Gary Allen Smith. Epic Films: Casts, Credits and Commentary on More Than 350 Spectacle Movies. McFarland, 2004.

External links 
 

1916 births
1995 deaths
Italian cinematographers
Film people from Naples